Marie-Theres Nadig (born 8 March 1954) is a retired Swiss alpine skier.

Biography
Aged 17, she won gold medals in the downhill and giant slalom events at the 1972 Winter Olympics. During her career, Nadig won 24 world cup races and had 57 podium finishes. At the 1980 Winter Olympics, she was third in the downhill event. After retiring from competitions, between 1999 and 2005 she worked as a national coach.

Career
Nadig won her first major competition in 1970, the giant slalom at the Swiss Junior Championships. She finished sixth in the downhill at the world cup in 1971, and second in 1972. The same year, she won two Olympic gold medals, beating the favorite Annemarie Moser-Pröll and becoming the Swiss Sportswoman of the Year. She also took part in the slalom, but failed to finish.

After a few unsuccessful years, Nadig won two downhill events at the 1975 World Cup season. She competed in the slalom and giant slalom at the 1976 Olympics, but failed to achieve a podium. She recovered in 1977 by winning the downhill and the combined world cup events, and had a brilliant 1979–1980 season, finishing on the podium in all 14 world cup events, and winning 9 of them. However, at the 1980 Olympics, she earned only a bronze in the downhill and failed to finish the slalom and giant slalom.

Retirement from skiing 
Nadig retired in 1981 with a world cup tally of 24 wins and 57 podium finishes. She ran a sports store in Switzerland and later a hotel and as a ski school. Between 1999 and 2005 she worked with the Swiss national teams. The 2004/05 season was the worst ever for the Swiss women ski racers since the introduction of the World Cup. After the team failed to win a medal at the 2005 World Championships, Nadig was let go in March 2005. She finally ended her coaching career in October 2005.

References

External links
 
 

1954 births
Living people
Swiss female alpine skiers
Olympic alpine skiers of Switzerland
Olympic gold medalists for Switzerland
Olympic bronze medalists for Switzerland
Olympic medalists in alpine skiing
Medalists at the 1972 Winter Olympics
Medalists at the 1980 Winter Olympics
Alpine skiers at the 1972 Winter Olympics
Alpine skiers at the 1976 Winter Olympics
Alpine skiers at the 1980 Winter Olympics
FIS Alpine Ski World Cup champions
20th-century Swiss women